Aero Composite Technologies was a kitplane manufacturer based in Somerset, Pennsylvania. It purchased the rights to the Sea Hawker amphibious aircraft from Aero Composites in 1988 and marketed them for a short time before being forced into receivership amidst bad publicity that the design had developed.

Companies based in Somerset County, Pennsylvania
Defunct aircraft manufacturers of the United States
Defunct companies based in Pennsylvania
Companies with year of establishment missing
Companies with year of disestablishment missing